The Catholic Record Society (Registered Charity No. 313529), founded in 1904, is a scholarly society devoted to the study of Reformation and post-Reformation Catholicism in England and Wales. It has been described as "the premier Catholic historical society in the United Kingdom", and has been credited with making much otherwise obscure archival material more readily available.

History
The society was initially established in 1904 as a text publication society, with the aim of publishing Catholic historical records. Active members in its early years included Joseph Gillow, J. H. Pollen, and Joseph S. Hansom. It subsequently developed into a more general historical society.

Publications
The Society continues to issue volumes of source material relating to Catholic history in the CRS Records Series; and a separate series of monographs, CRS Monographs. Both series are published on the Society's behalf by Boydell & Brewer.

It also publishes a journal, which was originally titled Biographical Studies, 1534–1829 (volumes 1–3, 1951–56); then Recusant History (volumes 4–31, 1957–2014); but which since volume 32 (2015) has been known as British Catholic History, and is published by Cambridge University Press.

Conferences
A residential three-day conference is organised each year, at which the Society's AGM takes place. For many years these events took place at Plater College, Oxford. Since then it has moved to Liverpool and Cambridge, and has been based at the Bar Convent in York since 2019.  The 2021 Conference will be held on Zoom.

References

External links
 
 
 Journal webpages on Cambridge University Press website, http://journals.cambridge.org/action/displayJournal?jid=BCH.
 Catholic Record Society, Records Series, Miscellanea VI (1909).

1904 establishments in the United Kingdom
Charities based in England
History organisations based in the United Kingdom
Learned societies of the United Kingdom
Text publication societies
Organizations established in 1904